The UK Rock & Metal Albums Chart is a record chart which ranks the best-selling rock and heavy metal albums in the United Kingdom. Compiled and published by the Official Charts Company, the data is based on each album's weekly physical sales, digital downloads and streams. In 2005, there were 19 albums that topped the 52 published charts. The first number-one album of the year was American Idiot, the seventh studio album by Green Day, which was released the previous year and spent 18 consecutive weeks at number one from 30 October 2004. The first new number-one album of the year was The Mars Volta's second studio album Frances the Mute. The final number-one album of the year was Green Day's first full-length live album Bullet in a Bible, which spent the last three weeks of the year at number one.

The most successful album on the UK Rock & Metal Albums Chart in 2005 was American Idiot, which spent a total of 16 weeks at number one over five separate spells, including one of nine consecutive weeks. In Your Honor, the fifth studio album by Foo Fighters, was number one for eight weeks in 2005, while Don't Believe the Truth by Oasis spent six weeks at number one and was the best-selling rock and metal album of the year, ranking 13th in the UK End of Year Albums Chart. Bullet in a Bible by Green Day spent four weeks at number one in 2005, Queens of the Stone Age's fourth studio album Lullabies to Paralyze spent three weeks at number one, and two albums – the Roadrunner United collaboration album The All-Star Sessions and Blink-182's Greatest Hits compilation – each spent two weeks at number one in 2005.

Chart history

See also
2005 in British music
List of UK Rock & Metal Singles Chart number ones of 2005

References

External links
Official UK Rock & Metal Albums Chart Top 40 at the Official Charts Company
The Official UK Top 40 Rock Albums at BBC Radio 1

2005 in British music
United Kingdom Rock and Metal Albums
2005